Liao Wenfen (born 30 April 1963) is a retired Chinese long jumper.

International competitions

References

1963 births
Living people
Chinese female long jumpers
Olympic athletes of China
Athletes (track and field) at the 1984 Summer Olympics
Athletes (track and field) at the 1988 Summer Olympics
Asian Games medalists in athletics (track and field)
Athletes (track and field) at the 1982 Asian Games
Athletes (track and field) at the 1986 Asian Games
Asian Games gold medalists for China
Medalists at the 1982 Asian Games
Medalists at the 1986 Asian Games
20th-century Chinese women